John Blennerhassett Martin (September 5, 1797 – October 27, 1857), was an American painter, engraver and lithographer.

Biography
Martin was born in Bandon, County Cork Ireland, but emigrated at age 18 to the United States in 1815. He initially lived and studied engraving in New York City, then in 1816 moved to Richmond, Virginia where he lived and worked. Martin painted a series of portraits of Chief Justice John Marshall, one of which hung in the US Supreme Court Building for many years. Martin also painted a notable portrait of James Armistead. He died in Richmond in 1857.

References

19th-century American painters
19th-century American male artists
American male painters
People from Virginia
1797 births
1857 deaths
John